Frank Christopher Busch is a Cree writer from Canada, who was a winner of the Burt Award for First Nations, Métis and Inuit Literature in 2015 for his debut novel Grey Eyes.

A member of the Nisichawayasihk Cree Nation in Manitoba, he wrote the novel after interviewing Indian residential school survivors while working for a law firm in Winnipeg. He currently lives on the Westbank First Nation in British Columbia, where he is director of marketing for the First Nations Finance Authority.

References

21st-century Canadian novelists
Canadian male novelists
Cree people
First Nations novelists
Writers from Saskatoon
Living people
1978 births
21st-century Canadian male writers
21st-century First Nations writers